The Spitalfields Sculpture Prize is a £45,000 commission for a new public work to be sited in Bishops Square in the Spitalfields area of London. It is projected that it will be seen by more than 70,000 people a week. The winning sculpture will become a permanent part of the Spitalfields Public Art Collection and go on display in October 2010.

The 8 shortlisted artists are: Wenqin Chen, Cinimod Studio, Paul Friedlander, Ryan Gander, Elpida Hadzi-Vasileva, Tod Hanson, Nick Hornby (artist), Kenny Hunter.

References

External links
www.spitalfields.co.uk/sculpture/
www.artdaily.org/index.asp?int_sec=11&int_new=34141

Sculpture awards
Spitalfields
London awards